is a train station in Takamori, Kumamoto Prefecture, Japan. It is on the Takamori Line, operated by the Minamiaso Railway. This is the only station on the line that is staffed.

Following the damage from severe earthquakes in April 2016, the entire Takamori Line was shut down. The section between this station and Nakamatsu Station resumed service in July of the same year.

Gallery

External links
Takamori Station (Minamiaso Railway website)

References

Railway stations in Kumamoto Prefecture
Railway stations in Japan opened in 1928